Secular Shrine Theory or  was a religious policy and political theory that arose in Japan during the 19th and early 20th centuries due to the separation of church and state of the Meiji Government. It was the idea that Shinto Shrines were secular in their nature rather than religious, and that Shinto was not a religion, but rather a secular set of Japanese national traditions. This was linked to State Shinto and the idea that the state controlling and enforcing Shinto was not a violation of freedom of religion. It was subject to immense debate over this time and ultimately declined and disappeared during the Shōwa era.

Linguistic debate 

Translating the word "religion" into Japanese has been controversial from the beginning, with some scholars arguing it was a Christian concept that did not apply to Shinto.

According to Genchi Kato:

 In other words, Shinto was not included in the translation of "religion".

In the Taishō era (1912–1926), the origin of the word "religion" was traced back to Latin, which came from Christian studies. The classical etymology of the word, traced to Cicero himself, derives it from : prefix re- ("again") + lego ("read"), where lego is in the sense of "go over", "choose", or "consider carefully".

The word  comes from Buddhism, according to Buddhist scholar Hajime Nakamura . In Buddhism, it means "the teaching of the sect", that is, the "teaching" of the "sect", which means the ultimate principle or truth, and religion existed as a subordinate concept of Buddhism .

Christian theologians have traditionally held that the meaning and wording of the word religion has been continued in its original meaning , which is the way it is used today. The Christian position in Japan has always been that Shinto is a religion since its introduction. In Japan, there was a deep-rooted sense of caution against foreign religions, and problems arose accordingly. Christian missionary activity, which began at the beginning of the Meiji era, was also divided into different denominations, and problems arose as a result.

It is believed that the Shinto side adopted the Secular Shrine Theory in part because they argued that Shinto is different from Buddhism and Christianity, that is, it is unique to Japan. On the contrary, from the Buddhist and Christian sides, the argument was that Shinto is a religion because it has an object of veneration.

Of course, during that time, the religious and non-religious nature of Shinto shrines was debated not as a legal issue but purely as a matter of religious studies. However, it never became a social or political issue that could move public opinion, because it was a debate within the realm of universities and academia, and never developed into a political movement.

That said, there are modern objections to this, and P. Burger, in The Sacred Canopy.

Meiji Constitution 
The Meiji Constitution said that subjects will have freedom of religion as long as it does not inferfere with their duties as subjects, this has been interpreted as making the Imperial Cult separate

On January 24, 1882, a Home Ministry notice stated that shrines were not religious (Secular Shrine Theory). However, Shinto funeral rites under Prefectural shrines were allowed, and the priests of the great shrines were not considered clergy 

It was argued that

In the "On the Relationship between Religious Bills and Shrines", which appears to have been prepared by the Home Ministry Bureau of Shrines around 1930, it was stated that:

Internal Shinto controversy 
Originally, the Meiji government was aiming for a politics of "Unity of ritual and government" due to the "Proclamation of the Great Doctrine", but due to the conflict between the "Buddhist side" and the "Shinto side" over the teaching profession, "the joint mission of God and Buddha was prohibited". It begins with the transfer of each religious administration to the Ministry of Interior. The following is a description of the situation that led to the "separation of religious and political affairs" from the "Shinto controversy". The separation of religious and political affairs is said to have been proposed by the Shinto side, and was led by Maruyama Sakurai  and others.

Following the dissolution of the Great Teaching Institute, the Bureau of Shinto Affairs was established, and in 1881, the Shinto priests of the Ise sect,  and others, and the priest of the Izumo sect, argued over the ritual deity  This led to an imperial request to Emperor Meiji. It was the successor to 's theory that Shinto is not a religion, and the political powers that be were forced to confirm it, and to forbid all religious speech, teaching, and religious acts (such as funeral rites) by priests involved in state ceremonies. This would have completely blocked the way for "Shinto as a religious belief" to become the national religion.

It is not clear who the primary proponents on the Shinto side were. Originally, the word "" was a translation of the English word "religion", and there is no clear definition of the concept. The Shinto side referred to Shinto as the "national religion" or "main religion", but there was no such theory that Shinto was a part of a religion. The non-religious theory of Maruyama Sakurai and others is thought to have been based on their concern about the situation in which Shinto was becoming divided due to ritual god disputes, etc., which resembled "religious theological disputes" in the new terminology of the time, and the fact that Shinto could not maintain its national status without stopping such divisions.

According to Yoshio Keino of Keio University, the government did not originally present the theory of non-religious shrines, but it was actively promoted by the Buddhist side. This is because the situation at the time was that the definition of religion was "proselytizing and conducting funerals.

Among them, Yamada Akiyoshi, the Minister of the Interior, adopted the theory of non-religious shrines presented by the Shinto side, including Maruyama Sakurai.

Later,  left the Bureau of Shinto Affairs in order to proselytize and founded the Izumo Taisha-kyo.

Department of Divinities Reconstruction Movement 
After the Satsuma Rebellion, the Satsuma Domain and other Shizoku began to focus on the management of Shinto shrines dedicated to their Ujigami. And with that, the Priests emerged as the Freedom and People's Rights Movement.

In June 1887, Shinto priests in Kyushu organized the Saikai Rengo-kai, which appealed to Shintoists throughout the country, arousing strong sympathy and emerging as a nationwide organized movement of Shinto priests . On November 17, 1887, representatives from each prefecture met at the Imperial Classic Research Institute, and each committee member formed an association of priests, and the movement to revive the Shinto priests was launched nationwide.

Also, in March 1890, rumors circulated in Shinto circles that Shinto was also included as a religion in order to restore it to its original state.

And behind the nationwide movement in the 1890s to revive the Shinto priesthood was a sense of "crisis" among Shinto priests and those involved in the Shinto religion against a government that was promoting a skeletonization of the "state's suzerainty" of Shinto shrines. When rumors of the religious ordinances began to circulate, a full-scale movement was launched to restore the Shinto priesthood by returning the teaching positions of the so-called " priests" below the rank of prefectures and shrines.

This movement was somewhat successful, and on April 26, 1899, the Shrine Division, which was only a division of the Bureau of Shrines and Temples of the Ministry of Home Affairs, was upgraded to the Bureau of Shrines. The Bureau of Religions also being split off to deal with other religions such as Sect Shinto.

On June 13, 1913, the Bureau of Religions which was run under the Home Ministry, which had jurisdiction over religions other than Shinto shrines, was transferred to the Ministry of Education, Science, Sports and Culture.

The debate was whether Shinto shrines are "non-religious" or "religious". In particular, if shrines were religious, the Ministry of Education, Science, Sports and Culture has jurisdiction over it, and if they were secular the Home Ministry would have had jurisdiction over them. Some have also arisen as a result of policies taken by the government to bring religious organizations under the rule of law.

20th century 
Meiji Shrine priest and general Ichinohe Hyoe advocated categorizing Shinto as a religion

Decline 
As the wartime atmosphere became more intense through the February 26 Incident, May 15 Incident, etc., discussions on secular shrine theory were silenced.

After discussion and deliberation by the Religious System Research Committee established by the Ministry of Education, Science, Sports and Culture, a report was submitted to the legislature on the enactment of the Religious Organizations Law, with the aim of bringing religious organizations under the legal system and having them observe the rules that they have voluntarily established. However, it was repeatedly rejected by the majority. However, through persistent persuasion, with the passage of the Religious Organizations Law by Law No. 77 of April 8, 1939, the legislature legally abandoned the 'Secular Shrine Theory'. Because Sect Shinto was now required by law to be designated and approved.

On November 9, 1940, the Ministry of the Interior reorganized its Bureau of Religions and established the Institute of Divinities, which was able to maintain "Secular Shrine Theory as the national religion". Also, in the Penal Code of the time, the Peace Preservation Law and Lèse-majesté to the Emperor of Japan and Jingu, especially the Special Higher Police suppression of other religions existed.

With this shift secular shrine theory came to be replaced by a more authoritarian form of State Shinto

See also 
 Political science
 American civil religion often conceptualized in a similar way
 State Shinto the resulting policies of this theory
 Shendao shejiao

Annotations

Footnotes

References

Bibliography 

Separation of church and state
Intellectual history
History of Shinto
Religious policy in Japan
State Shinto
Shinto
Pages with unreviewed translations